Posey is an unincorporated community in Clinton County, Illinois, United States.

G. R. Beckmeyer (1920–1977), Illinois businessman and politician, was born in Posey.

References

Unincorporated communities in Clinton County, Illinois
Unincorporated communities in Illinois